In the first edition of the tournament, Elena Wagner won the title after her opponent Ai Sugiyama was forced to retire before the start of the third set.

Seeds

Draw

Finals

Top half

Bottom half

References

External links
 Official results archive (ITF)

1994 WTA Tour
Commonwealth Bank Tennis Classic